Dr. Venkatesh Kabde (born 4 September 1940) is an Indian politician who is representing the former Member of Parliament for Nanded constituency of Maharashtra and was a member of the Janata Dal political party.
 Dr. Venkatesh Kabde leads the governing body of peoples college Nanded.

References

India MPs 1989–1991
1940 births
Living people
Marathi politicians
Janata Dal politicians
Lok Sabha members from Maharashtra
People from Nanded district